Kelvin Ho-Por Lam (Chinese: 林浩波, born June 1979) is a Hong Kong politician and macro-economist who formerly served as Southern District Councillor for the South Horizons (West) from 2020 until 2021. He was a former Greater China Economist with HSBC Global Markets. Before joining HSBC, he was a member of the Asia economics team at Citigroup Global Markets in Hong Kong.

Political involvement
Upon his returned to Hong Kong in early 2015, he has been actively participating in the civil society. He is now a member of the Southern District Council. He also provides economic advisory to the Office of LegCo Councillor, Au Nok Hin.

He planned to run for a seat in Hong Kong’s legislative council functional constituency (financial services sector) that was due to take place in September 2020, but has been postponed by the Hong Kong government amid a rise in virus cases.

Work as District Councillor
In terms of his recent work as a councillor, he wrote on the contentious issue of bailing out the failing Ocean Park Hong Kong.  He blames the cause of the park's downfall on government's policy error.  The Hong Kong government introduced CEPA (Individual Visitor's Scheme) in 2003, aiming to forge closer economic ties with China. However, the underlining agenda was to make the local economy more reliant on Chinese demand, making the wider economy less diversified.

References 

1979 births
Living people
District councillors of Southern District